Senator Avery may refer to:

Bill Avery (born 1942), Nebraska State Senate
Edward Avery (judge) (1790–1866), Ohio State Senate
Elroy M. Avery (1844–1935), Ohio State Senate
Frank Avery (1830–1919), Wisconsin State Senate
Waightstill Avery (1741–1821), North Carolina State Senate
William Waightstill Avery (1816–1864), North Carolina State Senate